Eugène-Melchior Péligot (24 March 1811 – 15 April 1890), also known as Eugène Péligot, was a French chemist who isolated the first sample of uranium metal in 1841.

Péligot proved that the black powder of Martin Heinrich Klaproth was not a pure metal (it was an oxide of uranium, known in chemistry as UO2).  He then succeeded in producing pure uranium metal by reducing uranium tetrachloride (UCl4) with potassium metal.  Today better methods have been found.

Péligot was a professor of analytical chemistry at the Institut National Agronomique. He collaborated with Jean-Baptiste Dumas, and together they discovered the methyl radical during experiments on wood spirit (methanol). The terminology "methyl alcohol" was created by both chemists from "wood wine". They also prepared the gaseous dimethyl ether, and many esters. In 1838, they successfully transformed camphor into p-cymene using phosphorus pentoxide.

In 1844 he synthesized chromium(II) acetate, which was much later recognized (by F. Albert Cotton in 1964) to be the first chemical compound which contains a quadruple bond.

See also
 List of chemists

References

External links
 Photograph of Peligot

1811 births
1890 deaths
19th-century French chemists
Scientists from Paris
Uranium
Burials at Père Lachaise Cemetery